The 1934 Swindon by-election was held on 25 October 1934.  The by-election was held due to the appointment as county court judge of the incumbent Conservative MP, Reginald Mitchell Banks.  It was won by the Labour candidate Christopher Addison.

References

1934 elections in the United Kingdom
1934 in England
20th century in Wiltshire
October 1934 events
Politics of the Borough of Swindon
By-elections to the Parliament of the United Kingdom in Wiltshire constituencies